Grupo Desportivo Fabril is a Portuguese sports club established as Grupo Desportivo CUF do Barreiro (commonly known as CUF Barreiro), with CUF standing for the company Companhia União Fabril. A multisports club best known for its football section, it was founded as a works team in the city of Barreiro, District of Setúbal, on 27 January 1937. CUF Barreiro's greatest achievement was a third place in the 1964–65 Portuguese Liga season. The club's football home ground is the Complexo Desportivo Alfredo da Silva, which was inaugurated in June 1965 and named after Alfredo da Silva, an entrepreneur who was the founder of CUF.

Besides football, Fabril's futsal team has reached top-flight twice in their history, participating in the I Divisão in the 2012–13 and 2016–17 seasons. In the 2012–13 season, Fabril reached the 5th round of the Taça de Portugal.



History
Established as Grupo Desportivo da CUF (G.D. CUF, with CUF standing for the company Companhia União Fabril) in 1937, it also was known as CUF Barreiro, it was one of three football clubs created by the parent company, whose players were also workers (the other clubs were CUF Lisboa, founded in 1936 and now known as Unidos de Lisboa, and the short-lived CUF Porto, that existed between 1945 and 1950). In 1940, the Estado Novo forced the club to change its name, as it didn't allow sports teams with corporate names. Thus the club changed its name to Unidos Futebol Clube or Unidos do Barreiro (CUF Lisboa, meanwhile changed to Clube de Futebol Os Unidos or Unidos de Lisboa). The original name returned in 1944. After the military coup in April 1974 the club was renamed Grupo Desportivo Quimigal .

The club changed its name several times during its history:

 1937 : The club was founded under the name Grupo Desportivo CUF do Barreiro
 1940 : The club is renamed as the Unidos Futebol Clube do Barreiro
 1944 : The club is renamed again as the Grupo Desportivo CUF do Barreiro
 1978 : The club is renamed as the Grupo Desportivo Quimigal do Barreiro
 2000 : The club is renamed as the Grupo Desportivo Fabril do Barreiro

Timeline
1937 – Grupo Desportivo da CUF (CUF Sporting Club) is founded on 27 January. CUF (Companhia União Fabril) was a soap and chemical manufacturer founded by Alfredo da Silva.
1939 – Joaquim Fernandes, a G.D. CUF cyclist, wins the Volta a Portugal.
1942–43 – The senior football team participates for first time in the first division, only managing to stay one season. Also that year, Alfredo da Silva dies.
1953–54 – The football team wins the second division and is promoted to the first division again, ushering a golden era for the club. The most important players were Barriga, Vasques, Luís, Sérgio, Aureliano, André, Carreira (captain), Orlando, Matos, Vale and Velhinho and the coach was João Mário. The club would remain in the first division for the next 22 years. That same year, the junior team became vice-champions of the first division losing in the final against Academica Coimbra.
1964–65 – The football team achieved its highest position to date in the first division reaching the third place among 14 teams, qualifying for a European competition, the Inter-Cities Fairs Cup (now UEFA Cup), the first time. The rink hockey would perform even better, becoming national champions.
1965–66 – The Alfredo da Silva stadium is inaugurated leaving their former stadium, Santa Bárbara. In the Inter-Cities Fairs Cup, after a walkover in the first round, the team is eliminated by A.C. Milan after three games (2–0, 0–2, 0–1). The team would make two more appearances in the competition in 67/68 (1R) and in 72/73 (2R). The rink hockey team was eliminated from the Champions League in the first round by Reus Deportiu with a 1–4, 0–3 score.
1968–69 – Football team reach the semifinals of the Taça de Portugal, only to lose 7–2 on aggregate to eventual champions Benfica.
1972 – Víctor Domingos, the CUF and rink hockey national team goalkeeper, is considered the best player in the world in that position.
1972–73 – Football team reaches the Taça de Portugal semifinals again, only to lose to the other big Lisbon team, Sporting, 0–1 at home. Again, Sporting goes on to win the entire competition.
1974 –  Carnation Revolution. During the communist-inspired period known as PREC, the company CUF, one of the largest conglomerates of Portugal, is nationalized.
1975–76 – After 22 consecutive years in the first division, G.D. CUF is relegated to the second division after finishing in the 16th and last position. From then on, the football club would disappear into the lower divisions, never returning to the first division.
1980–81 – The club changes its name to Grupo Desportivo da Quimigal.
1991–92 – After decades in the professional divisions, the club fell into the Setúbal District Division.
1999-00 – Quimigal wins the Setúbal District Championship, but would be relegated again in the next year. At the end of the season the club's name changed to its current name, Grupo Desportivo Fabril.
2002–03 – The club wins the Setúbal District Championship again, only to be relegated again.
2006–07 – The club once again wins the Setúbal District Championship.
2012–13 – Tercera Divisão is disbanded, sending most of the clubs (excepting those promoted to the new Campeonato Nacional de Seniores) including Fabril, back to their district championships.
2013–14 – The club once again wins the Setúbal District Championship and is promoted to the Campeonato Nacional.

Sports

Athletics
Football
Futsal
Gymnastics
Rink Hockey
Judo
Rowing
Tennis

Football

Honours

 Portuguese Liga: 3rd place – 1964–65
 Portuguese Cup: Semi-Final – 1968–69, 1972–73
 Portuguese Second Division: Champion – 1953–54 
 AF Setúbal First Division: Champion – 1999–00, 2002–03, 2006–07, 2013–14, 2018–19 
 Inter-Cities Fairs Cup/UEFA Cup: 2nd Round – 1965–66, 1972–73
 Intertoto Cup: 1974

League and cup history

1D = First Division

3D = Third Division

FC = Fairs Cup

UC = UEFA Cup

International performance

As CUF Barreiro, the club has made three official appearances in international football competitions:

Futsal

Fabril has a futsal team that has played top tier futsal in the Liga Sport Zone.

Honours

 I Divisão: 9th place (relegated through the Relegation Playout; 3rd place) – 2012–13

Current squad

See also
 Companhia União Fabril

External links
Official Website (portuguese)
Grupo Desportivo Fabril do Barreiro at zerozero.pt (portuguese)
Grupo Desportivo Fabril do Barreiro at foradejogo.net (portuguese)
Football School (portuguese) 

Fabril, Grupo Desportivo
Association football clubs established in 1937
1937 establishments in Portugal
Primeira Liga clubs
Sport in Barreiro, Portugal
Works association football teams